The Finnish Confederation of Professionals (STTK) is a trade union confederation in Finland. It has a membership of 650,000 and represents salaried employees in Finland.

History
The STTK was founded in 1946, to represent
STTK's counterparts are the Central Organisation of Finnish Trade Unions (SAK) and the Confederation of Unions for Academic Professionals in Finland (AKAVA).

The STTK got its current form in 1993 when most of the unions affiliated with the bankrupt Confederation of Salaried Employees joined the original STTK, founded in 1946.

Member unions

Current
Affiliates in March 2020 were:

Former
Association of Finnish Harbour Foremen
Association of Foremen and Technical Functionaries
Confederation of State Employees' Unions – Pardia
Federation of Swedish Technicians in Finland
Finnish Engineer Officers' Union
Finnish Federation of Technicians in Special Branches SETELI
Finnish Police Union
Postal Officers' Union
Union of Sales and Marketing Professionals
Technical Functionaries of Communes
Trade Union Direct
Trade Union Nousu
Union of Salaried Employees

References

 
International Trade Union Confederation
Trade Union Advisory Committee to the OECD
European Trade Union Confederation
Council of Nordic Trade Unions
Trade unions established in 1946